Liu Dagang (born May 18, 1947) is a Chinese actor best known for his role as Sha Wujing in the 1986 television series Journey to the West.

Biography
Liu was born on May 18, 1947 in Beijing, China. He is a former actor at China Peking Opera.

He made his film debut in Kung Fu Cult Master (1993), playing a Shaolin monk. That same year, he had a minor role as Duan Hua in the historical television series Empress Dowager Cixi.

In 1994, he portrayed Kangxi Emperor in the epic fantasy television series The Book and the Sword, adapted from Hong Kong writer Jin Yong's wuxia novel of the same title. At the same year, he also portrayed Sun Chen, a regent of the state of Eastern Wu during the Three Kingdoms period, in the historical television series Romance of the Three Kingdoms, based on the novel by the same name by Luo Guanzhong.

In 1995, he portrayed Han Yuan in the historical television series Wu Zetian.

In 1996, he had a supporting role in the historical television series Prime Minister Liu Luoguo.

In 1998, he rose to fame after playing Sha Wujing in the shenmo television series Journey to the West, adapted from Wu Cheng'en's classical novel of the same title.

In 2000, he appeared in Smart Kid, an ancient costume comedy television series starring Dicky Cheung and Li Bingbing.

In 2003, he participated in Sword Master, a wuxia television series adaptation based on the novel of the same name by Taiwanese novelist Gu Long.

In 2004, he filmed as the President of martial arts school in Silver Hawk,  a film starring Li Bingbing.

In 2006, he had a cameo appearance in The Great Dunhuang, a historical television series starring Chen Hao and Tang Guoqiang.

In 2007, he starred opposite Liu Xiao Ling Tong, Ma Dehua, Chi Zhongrui in Wu Cheng'en and Journey to the West.

In 2010, he was cast in The Dream of Red Mansions, playing the father of Jiang Tong's character.

In 2015, he was cast in the lead role of Sha Wujing in the Paramount Pictures's production Journey to the West 3D, a 3D Chinese-American action fantasy film adaptation based on the novel of the same name by Wu Cheng'en.

Filmography

Film

Television

References

External links

1947 births
Male actors from Beijing
Living people
Chinese male television actors
20th-century Chinese male actors
21st-century Chinese male actors